Ernest & Bertram is a 2002 tragic comedy short film written and directed by Academy Award-winning filmmaker and actor Peter Spears.
The film spoofs Sesame Street characters Ernie and Bert. The film is based on Lillian Hellman's The Children's Hour, and depicts Bert and Ernie after they are outed by Variety magazine.  Although the film was a success at the Sundance Film Festival and the U.S Comedy Arts Festival, it kept from further distribution when Sesame Workshop served the film's producers with a cease and desist order for copyright violation.

Synopsis
When the film starts, Miss Piggy has discontinued a romantic relationship with Bert when rumors of the roommates being gay hit the media. After Ernie arrives home, the two converse, and upon learning of the break-up, reveals that he does love Bert "that way." Bert seems not to share this sentiment, resulting in Ernie's suicide.

References

External links

2000s parody films
2002 short films
2002 films
American LGBT-related short films
Films directed by Peter Spears
Films about sexuality
Films about suicide
Muppet parodies
Tragicomedy films
American comedy short films
2002 comedy films
2000s English-language films
2000s American films